Pershing Road is an east-west street on the south side of Chicago and in its immediate western suburbs in Cook County, Illinois. It is precisely four miles south of Madison Street, the division point between north and south street numbering, and marks the 3900 South point in the region's street numbering system. Its western segment, more commonly referred to as 39th Street, runs east from a U.S. Route 34 (Ogden Avenue) in Lyons to Illinois Route 50 (Cicero Avenue) in Cicero. Its eastern segment, officially known as Pershing Road, runs east from a cul-de-sac at 3600 West to Oakwood Boulevard, which continues east ending at U.S. Route 41 (Lake Shore Drive). All of the eastern segment lies within the city of Chicago.

In the suburbs, 39th Street constitutes the boundary between several of Cook County's townships. West of Harlem Avenue, Proviso and Riverside Townships are on the north and Lyons Township is on the south; east of Harlem, Berwyn and Cicero Townships are on the north and Stickney Township is on the south.

In DuPage County, The entire route segment borders Downers Grove Township on the north and York Township on the south.

Route description
39th street starts as a small residential road in Downers Grove in a wooded neighborhood.  It runs for approximately 1.9 miles while intersecting with Highland Avenue and Fairview avenue before interruption in a neighborhood after Washington Street by a retention area.  The road is a brief side street ending on Cass Avenue in Westmont for the DuPage County route.  Two smaller unconnected routes are in LaGrange and Lyons.

It resumes in Cook County at U.S. Route 34 (Ogden Avenue) in Lyons. While still in Lyons, 39th Street intersects with Illinois Route 43 (Harlem Avenue). The road continues east until it intersects Illinois Route 50 (Cicero Avenue) in Cicero.

39th Street and Pershing Road are split into two segments because Interstate 55 (Stevenson Expressway) runs in its path if it were to continue in either direction.

Pershing Road begins at a cul-de-sac at 3600 West, just west of St. Louis Avenue in Chicago. Continuing east, Pershing Road intersects Kedzie Avenue, Archer Avenue, and Halsted Street. About three-fourths of a mile east of Halsted Street, Pershing Road intersects Interstate 90/Interstate 94 (Dan Ryan Expressway). The street finally ends at Oakwood Boulevard, which continues east until its terminus at U.S. Route 41 (Lake Shore Drive) in Burnham Park.

History
Both segments of Pershing Road/39th Street were once called just 39th Street. The eastern segment was renamed to honor American general John J. Pershing.  It had previously been known as Egan Street, named for William Bradshaw Egan.

Major intersections

References

Streets in Chicago